The campo troupial or campo oriole (Icterus jamacaii) is a species of bird in the family Icteridae that is found in northeastern Brazil. At one time thought to be conspecific with the Venezuelan troupial and orange-backed troupial, it is now accepted as a separate species. It is a fairly common bird and the International Union for Conservation of Nature has rated it as a "least-concern species".

Name

The term troupial is from French troupiale, from troupe (“troop”), so named because they live in flocks. The Latin name icterus is from Greek ἴκτερος (íkteros, “jaundice”); the icterus was a bird the sight of which was believed to cure jaundice, perhaps the Eurasian golden oriole. It also had the more general meaning "yellow bird", which is why the name was later given to this and other New World orioles. Campo refers to a grass plain with semi-stunted trees. The specific name jamacaii comes from the name used for this species by Georg Marcgrave in the 1648 work Historia Naturalis Brasiliae; it may have been a Tupi word for this or another small black-and-yellow bird, or it may have been applied to the species by Portuguese settlers. Additional names used for this species in the 1800s include black-banded troupiale, soffre, and (erroneously) Jamaica yellow bird.

Description
The campo troupial is very similar in appearance to the Venezuelan troupial (Icterus icterus) with which it was at one time thought to be conspecific. It is bright orange apart from a black hood and bib, back, wings and tail. There is an uneven line dividing the bib from the breast. It differs from the Venezuelan troupial in having only a small patch of white on its wings and hardly any bluish skin around its eye, and it has orange epaulettes on its shoulders whereas the Venezuelan bird does not. It could also be confused with the orange-backed troupial (Icterus croconotus), with which it was also once considered conspecific, but that species has an orange head apart from a patch of black on its forehead, a sharp dividing line between its bib and its breast, and rather more orange on its back.

Distribution and habitat
The ranges of the Venezuelan troupial, the campo troupial and the orange-backed troupial do not overlap.

Ecology
The diet consists of insects and other small invertebrates, fruits and nectar; one individual was found to have 126 fly larvae in its stomach. Breeding takes place during the wet season, between December and March.

Status
The campo troupial is a fairly common bird with a wide range and the population seems to be stable. For these reasons, the International Union for Conservation of Nature has rated its conservation status as being of "least concern".

References

Campo troupial
Birds of the Caatinga
Endemic birds of Brazil
Campo troupial
Campo troupial
Taxonomy articles created by Polbot